The 97th Netzah Yehuda Battalion, previously known as Nahal Haredi, is a battalion in the Kfir Brigade of the Israel Defense Forces. The purpose of the unit is to allow Haredi Jewish men to serve as combat soldiers in the Israeli military by creating an atmosphere conducive to their religious convictions, within a framework that is strictly observant of Halakha. The Netzah Yehuda's primary area of operations is in the Palestinian city of Ramallah in the West Bank.

History and structure

The battalion was founded in 1999, and originally contained only 30 soldiers. It was started after about 18 months of discussions between a group of Haredi educators, led by Rabbi Yitzhak Bar-Chaim from Netzah Yehuda organization and the IDF. As of 2009, the battalion had grown to over 1,000 soldiers, and has reached the status of a fully functioning battalion. The battalion recently marked its 20th draft.

The battalion runs like every combat unit in the IDF. Training in the battalion is that of IDF infantry: five months of basic training, followed by an additional six months of advanced training.

Today, at any given time, the battalion holds close to 1,000 soldiers, including two full companies in training, one company commencing active service, and two operation units: Palchod (Recon/ First Company) and Mesaiat (Rifleman Company). A third operational unit, Mivtzayit, was created in October 2009, due to the large number of soldiers joining the battalion in the most recent drafts. In the past, there was a small special forces platoon (Machsar) composed of soldiers from the battalion, but this was disbanded shortly after Lt. Colonel Dror Shpigel became commander of the battalion.

A volunteer all-Haredi computer unit has also been created within the Israeli Air Force. This, and the Netzah Yehuda Battalion, are seen as models for the possible future incorporation of Haredi conscripts into the IDF, should the present draft exemption for the ultra-Orthodox community be lifted.

Among the men who have served in the unit is Sergeant Almog Shiloni.

Religious accommodations
The battalion's motto is "V'haya Machanecha Kadosh", "And Your [military] camp shall be holy", (Devarim 23:15) a phrase taken from the Torah describing the importance of keeping a Jewish military camp free of sin or ritually unclean objects (in exchange for Divine assistance in battle).

As the battalion places great emphasis on accommodating the religious needs of the soldiers, the Netzah Yehuda bases follow the most rigorous standards of Jewish dietary laws, and the only women permitted on these bases are wives of soldiers and officers, so that there would not be any interaction considered inappropriate according to Jewish religious law between men and women.

As the battalion runs on a voluntary basis and does not draft soldiers, it is one of the few units in the IDF which depends on a recruitment mechanism for new troops. It actively recruits soldiers from Haredi, Dati Leumi, and Chardal families; there are also many volunteers from overseas who enlist.

Combat
Until early December 2022 Netzah Yehuda was the only unit in the IDF which had been continuously stationed in the West Bank, initially in the Jordan Valley, and then the areas surrounding Jenin, Tulkarm, and Ramallah since the early 2000s, as all other units are frequently rotated between different areas. The IDF stated that the battalions planned move to the Golan Heights was not related to a series of controversial and violent incidents that occurred in 2022, including the death of Omar As’ad.

The battalion lost its first casualty on August 19, 2006, when a member of the Al-Aqsa Martyrs' Brigades, shot and killed Staff Sergeant Roi Farjoun of Yehud at the Beka'ot Checkpoint east of Nablus. A nearby Netzah Yehuda soldier then opened fire, and killed the attacker.

US investigation into conduct 
The US state department asked its embassy in Israel to produce a report on the battalion following allegations of abuse of Palestinians and the battalion involvement in the death of an 80-year-old Palestinian-American Omar As’ad in January 2022. Following this incident the Israeli military said it would temporarily move the unit from the West Bank to the Golan Heights. The IDF said the decision “was made out of a desire to diversify their operational deployment in multiple areas, in addition to accumulating more operational experience” and was unrelated to the death of As’ad. In late December 2022, the unit was transferred from the IDF Central Command to the Northern Command in preparation for an 11-months deployment in the Golan Heights. The base will operate under the arrangements of Haredi practice as before.

See also
 Chardal
 Hesder

References

External links
Nahal Haredi Official website

Battalions of Israel
Haredi Judaism in Israel
Chardal
Military units and formations established in 1999
1999 establishments in Israel
Haredi Judaism